Recep may refer to:

People

Surname
 Aziz Recep (born 1992), German-Greek footballer
 Sibel Recep (born 1987), Swedish pop singer

Given name
 Recep Adanır (born 1929), Turkish footballer
 Recep Akdağ (born 1960), Turkish physician and politician
 Recep Altepe (born 1959), Turkish politician
 Recep Biler (born 1981), Turkish footballer
 Recep Çelik (born 1983), Turkish racewalker
 Recep Çetin (born 1965), retired Turkish footballer
 Recep Niyaz (born 1995), Turkish footballer
 Recep Öztürk (born 1977), Turkish footballer
 Recep Pasha (died 1726), Ottoman statesman and governor
 Recep Peker (1889–1950), Turkish politician
 Recep Tayyip Erdoğan (born 1954), President of Turkey
 Recep Uslu (born 1958), Turkish writer

Other uses
 Recep's chub (Alburnoides recepi), a freshwater fish
 Recep, Çermik

See also
 Rexhep
 Rajab
 

Turkish masculine given names